"Dare to Dream" is a song recorded by American country music artist Jo Dee Messina.  It was released in May 2002 as the fifth single from the album Burn.  They reached #23 on the Billboard Hot Country Singles & Tracks chart.  The song was written by Adrienne Follesé and Jane Bach.

Chart performance

References

2002 singles
2000 songs
Jo Dee Messina songs
Song recordings produced by Byron Gallimore
Song recordings produced by Tim McGraw
Curb Records singles